Pseudomigadops is a genus of ground beetles in the family Carabidae. There are about seven described species in Pseudomigadops.

Species
These seven species belong to the genus Pseudomigadops:
 Pseudomigadops ater Straneo, 1969  (Chile)
 Pseudomigadops darwinii (G.R.Waterhouse, 1842)  (Argentina and Chile)
 Pseudomigadops falklandicus (G.R.Waterhouse, 1842)  (the Falkland Islands)
 Pseudomigadops fuscus Baehr, 1997  (the Falkland Islands)
 Pseudomigadops handkei Baehr, 1997  (the Falkland Islands)
 Pseudomigadops nigrocoeruleus (G.R.Waterhouse, 1842)  (Argentina and Chile)
 Pseudomigadops ovalis (G.R.Waterhouse, 1842)  (Argentina and Chile)

References

Migadopinae